Richard Mann may refer to: 

 Richard Mann (American football) (born 1947), American football coach
 Richard Mann (cricketer) (born 1982), English cricketer
 Richard G. Mann (born 1949), professor of art at San Francisco State University
 Richie Mann (born 1954), Canadian politician
 Dick Mann (1934–2021), American motorcycle racer
 Richard Mann (biologist), see Larry Sandler Memorial Award
 Richard Mann (diplomat), see List of ambassadors of New Zealand
 Richard Mann (actor) in Cyberman
 Rick Mann (musician) in A Passing Fancy
 Rick Mann (voice actor) in Weiß Kreuz